James Knowles (September 5, 1856 – February 11, 1912), nicknamed "Darby", was a Canadian Major League Baseball player who played mainly at the third base, but did play significant time at first base as well, for six different teams in his five-season career from 1884 to 1892. Born in Toronto, Ontario, Canada, Knowles died at the age of 55 in Jersey City, New Jersey, and is interred at Bayview – New York Bay Cemetery in Jersey City.

References

External links

1856 births
1912 deaths
Canadian expatriate baseball players in the United States
Baseball players from Toronto
Major League Baseball third basemen
Major League Baseball first basemen
19th-century baseball players
Pittsburgh Alleghenys players
New York Metropolitans players
Washington Nationals (1886–1889) players
Rochester Broncos players
New York Giants (NL) players
Brooklyn Atlantics (AA) players
Major League Baseball players from Canada
Pottsville Antarcites players
Washington Nationals (minor league) players
Rochester Maroons players
Jersey City Skeeters players
Rochester Jingoes players
Buffalo Bisons (minor league) players
Albany Senators players
Elmira Gladiators players
Providence Grays (minor league) players
Atlanta Crackers players
Norfolk Jewels players
Burials at Bayview – New York Bay Cemetery